The 2022 Minnesota Senate election was held in the U.S. state of Minnesota on November 8, 2022, to elect members of the Senate of the 93rd Minnesota Legislature. A primary election was held in several districts on August 9, 2022. The election coincided with the election of the other house of the Legislature, the Minnesota House of Representatives, and other elections. The Minnesota Democratic–Farmer–Labor Party retook control of the Senate from the Minnesota Republican Party, in addition to retaining the Governorship, Secretary of State, and Attorney General, giving the DFL undivided control of government for the first time since 2014.

Background 
The last election in 2020 resulted in the Republican Party of Minnesota retaining a majority of seats, after winning a majority from the Minnesota Democratic–Farmer–Labor Party (DFL) only four years earlier in the previous election in 2016. Control of the Senate has alternated between the Republicans and the DFL every election since 2010. All-Republican control of the Legislature ended when the DFL won a majority in the House in 2018.

Electoral system 
The 67 members of the Senate will be elected from single-member districts via first-past-the-post voting for four-year terms. Contested nominations of recognized major parties (DFL, Grassroots-Legalize Cannabis, Legal Marijuana Now, and Republican) for each district will be determined by an open primary election. Minor party candidates will be nominated by petition. Write-in candidates must file a request with the Secretary of State's office for votes for them to be counted. Candidates for the state Senate in 2022 were required to file to run between May 17, 2022 and May 31, 2022.

Retiring members

Republican 
Bill Ingebrigsten, 8th
Paul Gazelka, 9th
Carrie Ruud, 10th
Scott Newman, 18th
Mike Goggin, 21st
Julie Rosen, 23rd
Dave Senjem, 25th
Mary Kiffmeyer, 30th
Michelle Benson, 31st
David Osmek, 33rd

DFL 
 Kent Eken, 4th
 Jerry Newton, 37th
 Chris Eaton, 40th
Chuck Wiger, 43rd
Ann Johnson Stewart, 44th
Melisa Lopez Franzen, 49th
Susan Kent, 53rd
Karla Bigham, 54th
Greg Clausen, 57th
Patricia Torres Ray, 63rd

Independent 
 Tom Bakk, 3rd
 David Tomassoni, 6th (died before election)

Reapportionment 

Due to the 2020 United States Census, the law required redistricting to occur before February 15, 2022, in order to give candidates ample notice before the legislative filing window in late May. Historically, the legislature has often been unable to agree on redistricting, leading to a court decision on the issue.

In August 2021, hearings began in both the House and Senate Redistricting Committee, with the Senate committee members having their first meeting in Bemidji on August 9, and the House committee members having their first meeting on August 18.

A legal challenge was filed against the congressional and legislative maps, predicting that the state legislature would not draw valid maps and would malapportion the districts.

On March 22, 2021, the Minnesota Supreme Court appointed a special redistricting panel, but issued a stay on its proceedings; on June 30, the Supreme Court appointed judges to the panel and allowed it to proceed with its appointed business.

On February 15, 2022, after the Minnesota Legislature missed the redistricting deadline, the special redistricting panel released its own congressional and legislative maps.

Predictions

Results

Close races 
Districts where the margin of victory was under 10%:
District 35, 0.54%
District 41, 0.75%
District 3, 1.61% (gain)
District 14, 4.71%
District 33, 5.64%
District 36, 5.68%
District 58, 5.68%
District 4, 5.69%
District 32, 6.99%
District 7, 7%
District 48, 8.73%
District 34, 9.82%
District 37, 9.84%

District results

District 1

District 2

District 3

District 4

District 5

District 6

District 7

District 8

District 9

District 10

District 11

District 12

District 13

District 14

District 15

District 16

District 17

District 18

District 19

District 20

District 21

District 22

District 23

District 24

District 25

District 26

District 27

District 28

District 29

District 30

District 31

District 32

District 33

District 34

District 35

District 36

District 37

District 38

District 39

District 40

District 41

District 42

District 43

District 44

District 45

District 46

District 47

District 48

District 49

District 50

District 51

District 52

District 53

District 54

District 55

District 56

District 57

District 58

District 59

District 60

District 61

District 62

District 63

District 64

District 65

District 66

District 67

See also
 2022 Minnesota gubernatorial election
 2022 Minnesota House of Representatives election
 2022 Minnesota elections

References

External links
 Elections & Voting - Minnesota Secretary of State

Minnesota Senate elections
Minnesota Senate
Senate